Hiltzik is a surname. Notable people with the surname include:

Matthew Hiltzik (born 1972), American publicist and attorney
Michael Hiltzik (born 1952), American journalist and writer
Robert Hiltzik (born  1957), American film director